North Aurora is a village in Kane County, Illinois, United States, and a suburb of Chicago. Per the 2020 census, the population was 18,261. North Aurora maintains its own public library district, fire district, and police department, but public spaces and parks are managed by the neighboring Fox Valley Park District.

History 
In its early history, North Aurora was known as "Schneider's Mill" or "Schneider's Crossing" after John Peter Schneider, a German immigrant who established a mill and dam on the Fox River after moving to the area in 1834. Schneider Elementary School, on the east side of the Fox River, is named after him.

North Aurora was named due to its location north of Aurora, Illinois. The 1880 US Census was the first federal census to use the place-name "Village of North Aurora". It was formally incorporated in 1905.

Public services

Schools 
School-age children in North Aurora attend five public schools in the West Aurora Public School District 129, regardless of which side of the river they live on, with the exception of a few dozen homes in the far northeastern section of the village, in which the children attend Batavia School District 101. North Aurora's own district was absorbed into its neighbor, Aurora, in the early 1960s.

Police 
The village has 28 police officers with one chief and two deputy chiefs. After decades of sharing the same space as the village hall, the village constructed a new police headquarters at 200 S Lincolnway Street (IL Rt 31) in 2010. While an independent entity, there is some limited dependency on the Aurora Police Department; for example, calling the North Aurora police when the front desk is unattended will result in the call being answered by the Aurora Police Department 911 Center.

Fire department 
The North Aurora Fire Protection District covers North Aurora. Station #1 opened in 1963 at the corner of State and Monroe and Station #2 opened on March 16, 2007, at 2201 Tanner Road. Village Ordinance #21 created and chartered North Aurora Village Fire Department in 1908 as a volunteer service. On July 7, 1958, the department was renamed the North Aurora and Countryside Fire Protection District to cover areas outside of the village limits. On November 1, 1993, the district hired a fire chief as its first full-time employee and a month later hired two full-time firefighters.

Geography 
North Aurora is located in southeastern Kane County at  (41.808736, -88.341981). It is bordered to the south and east by the city of Aurora and to the north by the city of Batavia. Interstate 88 runs along the southern boundary of the village, with access from Exits 114 and 117. The highway leads east  to Hillside in the Chicago suburbs and west  to the Quad Cities.

The Fox River runs north–south through the village.

Demographics

2020 census

Note: the US Census treats Hispanic/Latino as an ethnic category. This table excludes Latinos from the racial categories and assigns them to a separate category. Hispanics/Latinos can be of any race.

2000 Census
As of the census of 2000, there were 10,585 people, 4,019 households, and 2,833 families residing in the village. The racial makeup of the village was 87.71% White, 4.48% African American, 0.21% Native American, 2.54% Asian, 0.03% Pacific Islander, 3.33% from other races, and 1.71% from two or more races. Hispanic or Latino of any race were 9.68% of the population.

There were 4,019 households, out of which 36.0% had children under the age of 18 living with them, 59.4% were married couples living together, 8.1% had a female householder with no husband present, and 29.5% were non-families. 24.5% of all households were made up of individuals, and 8.3% had someone living alone who was 65 years of age or older.  The average household size was 2.60 and the average family size was 3.14.

In the village, the population was spread out, with 27.1% under the age of 18, 6.8% from 18 to 24, 36.6% from 25 to 44, 19.7% from 45 to 64, and 9.9% who were 65 years of age or older.  The median age was 34 years. For every 100 females, there were 97.7 males.  For every 100 females age 18 and over, there were 95.1 males.

The median income for a household in the village was $58,557, and the median income for a family was $70,780. Males had a median income of $48,579 versus $31,522 for females. The per capita income for the village was $25,552.  About 1.5% of families and 3.0% of the population were below the poverty line, including 1.9% of those under age 18 and 10.1% of those age 65 or over.

The North Aurora Special Census that took place during the summer of 2007 indicated a new village population of 15,893. This is an increase of 2,129 residents, or 15.5% from the last special census that was conducted in 2004.

Media 
Waubonsee Community College runs Channel 99 WCC ETV, an educational television station

References

External links 
Official website
Messenger Public Library of North Aurora
West Aurora School District 129
North Aurora Fire Protection District

Villages in Kane County, Illinois
Populated places established in 1834
1834 establishments in Illinois